WCW Nitro Grill was an American professional wrestling-themed steak house owned by World Championship Wrestling (WCW) that opened in May 1999 at the Excalibur Hotel and Casino in Paradise, Nevada. It was built at a cost of $2 million. Professional wrestlers frequented the restaurant when they were touring in Las Vegas. The restaurant hosted weekly watch parties for WCW Monday Nitro and WCW Thunder as well as occasional autograph signings with members of the WCW roster. It closed on September 30, 2000 just six months before most of WCW's holdings were sold to the World Wrestling Federation (WWF, now WWE) in 2001. The dining room was 16,000 square feet and could seat 350 people. After the Las Vegas location opened, there were tentative plans to open more Nitro Grills across the United States, although none were ever announced.

See also
The World (WWE)
WWE Niagara Falls
Ribera Steakhouse
Dropkick Bar

References

1999 establishments in Nevada
2000 disestablishments in Nevada
Buildings and structures in Paradise, Nevada
Defunct restaurants in the United States
Former Time Warner subsidiaries
Restaurants established in 1999
Restaurants disestablished in 2000
Restaurants in the Las Vegas Valley
Sports-themed restaurants
Steakhouses
World Championship Wrestling
Wrestling culture